The 36th World Science Fiction Convention (Worldcon), also known as IguanaCon II, was held on 30 August–4 September 1978 at the Hyatt Regency Phoenix, Adams House, Phoenix Convention Center, and Phoenix Symphony Hall in Phoenix, Arizona, United States. Despite the name, this was the first "IguanaCon".

The original committee chairman was Greg Brown, who served for the first eighteen months of the convention committee's existence; he was replaced for the final six months prior to the convention and during the convention itself by Tim Kyger. Gary Farber was the de facto vice-chairman as well as director of operations during the convention.

Participants 

Attendance was approximately 4,700.

Guests of Honor 

 Harlan Ellison (pro)
 Bill Bowers (fan)
 F. M. Busby (toastmaster)

Josef Nesvadba had been announced as the European guest of honor, but he could not get travel papers and so did not attend.

Awards

1978 Hugo Awards 

 Best Novel: Gateway by Frederik Pohl
 Best Novella: "Stardance" by Spider and Jeanne Robinson
 Best Novelette: "Eyes of Amber" by Joan D. Vinge
 Best Short Story: "Jeffty Is Five" by Harlan Ellison
 Best Dramatic Presentation: Star Wars
 Best Professional Editor: George H. Scithers
 Best Professional Artist: Rick Sternbach
 Best Amateur Magazine: Locus, edited by Charles N. Brown and Dena Brown
 Best Fan Writer: Richard E. Geis
 Best Fan Artist: Phil Foglio

Other awards 

 Gandalf Awards
 Gandalf Grand Master Award: Poul Anderson
 Gandalf Award for Book-Length Fantasy: The Silmarillion by J. R. R. Tolkien (edited by Christopher Tolkien)
 John W. Campbell Award for Best New Writer: Orson Scott Card

See also 

 Hugo Award
 Science fiction
 Speculative fiction
 World Science Fiction Society
 Worldcon

References

External links 

 NESFA.org: The Long List
 NESFA.org: 1978 convention notes 
 Hugo.org: 1978 Hugo Awards

1978 conferences
1978 in Arizona
1978 in the United States
Science fiction conventions in the United States
Worldcon